James Lucas is a British/New Zealand screenwriter and film director. He is best known for co-writing and producing the British short drama film The Phone Call (2013), for which he won the Academy Award for Best Live Action Short Film at the 87th Academy Awards.Lucas was born in High Wycombe, England and grew up in Christchurch, New Zealand before moving back to London, where he has lived for the last 20 years.

After graduating from film school at London Metropolitan, being a Writer/Researcher at Talkback Television and an Assistant Editor at Tank Magazine, James worked at Ridley Scott’s RSA Films for a number of years - a time he cites as his "Masters in Film".

Since winning an Oscar James has gone on to make several more short films, written the critically acclaimed, award-winning feature film 'Whina', starring Rena Owen, released in 2021 and is currently in pre-production for his hotly anticipated Kate Moss biopic 'Moss & Freud', starring Ellie Bamber and Sir Derek Jacobi playing Lucian Freud.

References

External links 
 

New Zealand screenwriters
Male screenwriters
New Zealand film directors
Living people
Producers who won the Live Action Short Film Academy Award
Year of birth missing (living people)